Franklin Center may refer to:

Franklin Center (Chicago)
John Hope Franklin Center for Interdisciplinary and International Studies
Franklin News Foundation, formerly the Franklin Center for Government and Public Integrity
Franklin Center, New Jersey

See also
Franklin, Quebec, also known as Franklin Centre, Quebec